Liselott Hagberg (born 1958) is a Swedish Liberal politician who was a member of the Riksdag between 2002 and 2012. She was the Third Deputy Speaker of the Riksdag 2006–2012. In October 2012, Hagberg became Governor of Södermanland County. She served until the end of her extended term, on 31 December 2019.

References

External links 

 Liselott Hagberg at the Riksdag website

1958 births
21st-century Swedish women politicians
County governors of Sweden
Living people
Members of the Riksdag 2002–2006
Members of the Riksdag 2006–2010
Members of the Riksdag 2010–2014
Members of the Riksdag from the Liberals (Sweden)
People from Uddevalla Municipality
Women county governors of Sweden
Women members of the Riksdag